Diane Gerencser (born 27 January 1972) is a former ice dancer who competed internationally for both Switzerland and Italy. She placed as high as 15th at the World Championships—in 1990 with Alexander Stanislavov—and as high as 11th at the European Championships—in 1997 with Pasquale Camerlengo. She and Camerlengo represented Italy at the 1998 Winter Olympics, placing 17th.

Career 
From 1988 to 1991, Gerencser competed for Switzerland with Alexander Stanislavov. Their highest ISU Championship placements were 15th at the 1990 World Championships and 13th at the 1991 European Championships.

From 1992 to 1995, Gerencser competed with Bernard Columberg, also for Switzerland. They appeared at three World Championships, achieving their best result, 18th, in 1993, and at three European Championships, attaining a rank of 15th in 1995.

In 1996, Gerencser began competing with Pasquale Camerlengo for Italy. They were coached by Muriel Boucher-Zazoui in Villard-de-Lans and Lyon. The duo placed 11th at the 1997 European Championships and 17th at the 1998 Winter Olympics in Nagano, Japan. They retired from competition after the 1998 World Championships.

Results

With Camerlengo

With Columberg

With Stanislavov

References

 Skatabase: 1990s Olympics
 Skatabase: 1980s Worlds
 Skatabase: 1990s Worlds
 Skatabase: 1980s Europeans
 Skatabase: 1990s Europeans

1972 births
Living people
Italian female ice dancers
Swiss female ice dancers
Olympic figure skaters of Italy
Figure skaters at the 1998 Winter Olympics
Italian people of Swiss descent
Sportspeople from Geneva